Jean-Pierre Giran (born 9 January 1947 in Marseille) is a member of the National Assembly of France.  He represents the Var department,  and is a member of the Union for a Popular Movement. He is the mayor of Hyères since 2014.

References

1947 births
Living people
Politicians from Marseille
Rally for the Republic politicians
Union for a Popular Movement politicians
Gaullism, a way forward for France
The Popular Right
Deputies of the 12th National Assembly of the French Fifth Republic
Deputies of the 13th National Assembly of the French Fifth Republic
Deputies of the 14th National Assembly of the French Fifth Republic